John Henry Parker  (1 March 1806 – 31 January 1884) was an English archaeologist and writer on architecture and publisher.

Biography
He was born in London, the son of John Parker, a merchant there. He was educated at Manor House School, Chiswick, and was apprenticed in 1821 to his uncle, the Oxford bookseller Joseph Parker (1774?–1850). He succeeded to his uncle's business in 1832, and ran the firm with great success, the most important of his publications being perhaps the series of the Oxford pocket classics.

In 1836 he published his Glossary of terms used in Grecian, Roman, Italian, and Gothic architecture, which, published during the Gothic Revival in England, had considerable influence in extending the movement, and supplied valuable inspiration to young architects. In 1848 he edited the fifth edition of Thomas Rickman's Gothic architecture, and in 1849 he published a handbook based on his earlier volume entitled Introduction to the study of Gothic architecture. The completion of Hudson Turner's Domestic architecture of the Middle Ages next engaged his attention, three volumes being published (1853–60). He published Medieval architecture of Chester in 1858 and Architectural antiquities of the city of Wells in 1866.

Parker was one of the chief advocates of the restoration of ecclesiastical buildings. In 1863 he and the Oxford Diocesan Architect G.E. Street revised plans for the restoration of St. Andrew's parish church, Chinnor. Parker also designed the triplet of traceried lancet windows in the chancel of St. Nicholas the Confessor, Forest Hill. His son James Parker (1832 or 1833–1912) also practiced as an architect.

Later he devoted much attention to explorations of the history of Rome by means of excavations, and succeeded in satisfying himself of the historical truth of much usually regarded as legendary. Two volumes of his Archaeology of Rome were published at Oxford in 1874 and 1876.

In recognition of his work Parker was decorated by King Victor Emmanuel II of Italy and received a medal from Pope Pius IX. In 1869 he endowed the keepership of the Ashmolean Museum with a sum yielding £250 a year, and under the new arrangement he was appointed the first keeper. In 1871 he was nominated CB.

In Italy one of Parker's principal projects was to compose an archive collection of photographs of the city's greatest monuments from the Renaissance era onwards. Employing local photographers the collection recorded not only Rome's greatest building and works, but also detailed scenes of the late 19th century archaeological excavations. He used many of these to illustrate his books. In 1893 the entire archive perished in a fire at the Palazzo Della Porta Negroni Caffarelli depriving modern archeologists of an invaluable source of material.

He died in Oxford.

Publications
 A manual of gothic mouldings, and continuous ornament 
 A manual of surface ornament 
 A manual of gothic stone carving
 A glossary of terms used in British heraldry. Oxford, 1847
 A Catalogue of a Series of Photographs Illustrative of the Archæology of Rome: Supplement to a catalogue... , Oxford, 1867.
 A B C of Gothic Architecture, London, 1881.

Notes

References

Further reading

External links
 
 
 The grave of John Henry Parker and his wife Frances in St Sepulchre's Cemetery, Oxford, with biography

1806 births
1884 deaths
English architecture writers
English archaeologists
Companions of the Order of the Bath
People associated with the Ashmolean Museum
English booksellers
English male non-fiction writers
19th-century English businesspeople
Burials at St Sepulchre's Cemetery